Boris Frederic Cecil Tay-Natey Ofuatey-Kodjoe (born March 8, 1973) is a German actor and former model best known for his roles as Kelby in the 2002 film Brown Sugar, the sports-courier agent Damon Carter on the Showtime drama series Soul Food, Dr. Will Campbell on CBS's Code Black and a recurring character on FOX's The Last Man on Earth. He co-stars on BET's Real Husbands of Hollywood and the Grey's Anatomy spin-off, Station 19 as Robert Sullivan.

Early life 
Kodjoe was born in Vienna, Austria, the son of Ursula, a German psychologist of partially Jewish descent, and Eric Kodjoe, a Ghanaian physician who is of the Nzema people. His namesake is the Russian poet and writer Boris Pasternak. Kodjoe's matrilineal great-grandmother was Jewish and was murdered in the Holocaust; his maternal grandmother survived the war in hiding. Kodjoe's parents divorced when he was six years old. He grew up in the vicinity of Freiburg im Breisgau, Germany. He has a brother named Patrick and two sisters named Nadja and Lara.

Career 
Kodjoe attended Virginia Commonwealth University on a tennis scholarship and graduated with a bachelor's degree in marketing in 1996. A four-year letterman on the Rams' men's tennis team, he is currently ninth in school history with 75 career singles wins. Tied for third in doubles victories with 66, he was paired with Jonas Elmblad on 37 of them, also third all-time. His brother Patrick Kodjoe played for VCU's basketball team. A back injury ended Boris' tennis aspirations, but he was quickly signed as a model and, soon after, entered acting. In 1995, he was featured in TLC's music video for "Red Light Special."

Named one of the "50 Most Beautiful People in the World" by People magazine in 2002, Kodjoe is perhaps best known as one of the 7 regular cast members from the Showtime drama Soul Food, which aired from 2000 to 2004. He appeared in the 2002 film Brown Sugar and starred in the short-lived sitcom Second Time Around with his Soul Food co-star Nicole Ari Parker, whom he eventually married. He played the role of David Taylor, the wayward son of Pastor Fred Taylor, in the October 2005 film The Gospel. He performed in a play called Whatever She Wants, starring Vivica A. Fox, and made an appearance on the fifth season of Nip/Tuck. He had a supporting role in the 2009 science fiction film Surrogates. Kodjoe and Gugu Mbatha-Raw starred as a husband-and-wife secret agent team in 2010 J. J. Abrams-produced the NBC TV series Undercovers, but the show lasted less than one season. That year, he also appeared as Luther in the film Resident Evil: Afterlife. He had a guest appearance on the TV show Franklin & Bash in 2012.

From 2013 to 2016, Kodjoe starred as a fictional version of himself in the BET comedy parody series Real Husbands of Hollywood. In 2014 he was cast as a regular on the ABC primetime soap opera Members Only created by Susannah Grant, but the show never aired. In 2015, Kodjoe began a recurring guest role on Fox's The Last Man on Earth television series. Kodjoe was part of the ensemble cast for all three seasons of the CBS medical drama Code Black playing surgeon Dr. Will Campbell from 2016 to 2018.

In July 2018, Kodjoe landed a recurring role in the second season of the Grey's Anatomy spin-off series Station 19. In October, he was promoted to a series regular after his appearance in the season premiere as the new fire captain, Robert Sullivan.  In "Eulogy", he is promoted to Battalion Chief.

Personal life 
Kodjoe married his Soul Food: The Series co-star Nicole Ari Parker on May 21, 2005, in Gundelfingen, Germany. She gave birth to their first child, a girl, in March 2005. She has spina bifida, which was diagnosed at birth. Parker gave birth to the couple's second child, a boy, in October 2006. Kodjoe and his wife are members of Cascade United Methodist Church in Atlanta, Georgia. The family resides in Los Angeles, California. Parker and Kodjoe competed against one another on a February 2019 episode of Lip Sync Battle.

Kodjoe is fluent in German, English, Russian, French, and Italian; he also speaks a little Spanish.

Filmography

Film

Television

References

External links 

Boris Kodjoe at Rotten Tomatoes
Official website

1973 births
Living people
Male actors from Virginia
American male film actors
American male television actors
American male voice actors
American people of Ghanaian descent
American people of German-Jewish descent
Virginia Commonwealth University alumni
Actors from Baden-Württemberg
American United Methodists
German expatriate male actors in the United States
German male film actors
German male television actors
German male voice actors
German emigrants to the United States
German Methodists
People from Freiburg im Breisgau
Male actors from Vienna
20th-century German people